The Military Counterintelligence Service (MAD) is one of the three federal intelligence agencies in Germany, and is responsible for military counterintelligence. The other two are the Bundesnachrichtendienst (Federal Intelligence Service, BND), which is the foreign intelligence agency, and the Bundesamt für Verfassungsschutz (Federal Office for the Protection of the Constitution, BfV) which is the domestic civilian intelligence agency.

The headquarters of the MAD are in Cologne, with twelve groups located in cities throughout Germany. These MAD groups are collectively known to be the Militärischer Abschirmdienst. The agency has about 1,300 military and civilian employees and in 2019 the budget was 113.251.923 €.

Its formal name is Bundesamt für den Militärischen Abschirmdienst, changed from the former name Amt für die Sicherheit der Bundeswehr.

Duties 
The MAD is part of the  Bundeswehr, the German armed forces. As a domestic intelligence service, it has similar functions within the military as the Bundesamt für Verfassungsschutz and works closely together with the BfV.
The main duties of the MAD are counterintelligence and detection of "anticonstitutional activities" within the Bundeswehr. Other duties include the protection of Bundeswehr properties from sabotage and foreign espionage. Members of the MAD are also involved in planning and construction of buildings with high security requirements.
The MAD has no prosecution power.
The lead agency for the German military intelligence operations as well as strategic defense-related intelligence is the Bundesverteidigungsministerium (Ministry of Defense) in Berlin.

The legal basis for the MAD is the MAD Law of December 20, 1990, as amended by Article 8 of the law of April 22, 2005.

Organization 
As well as a department for administrative affairs, there are the following specialist departments:

 Department Z: Central services
 Department E: Counter-extremism and counter-terrorism
 Department S: Counterespionage and operative security
 Department IV: Protection of secrets (personnel and material)
 Department V: Technology

The 12 regional offices are in:

 Amberg
 Hannover
 Hilden
 Kiel
 Koblenz
 Leipzig
 Mainz
 Munich
 Rostock
 Schwielowsee
 Stuttgart

History 
The MAD developed out of a liaison office between the Allies and the German government and was founded in its present form in 1956, after the Bundeswehr was created. Until 1984, its headquarters was called "Amt für Sicherheit der Bundeswehr" (ASBw, Federal armed forces office of security).
The MAD has been involved in a number of scandals, including the secret surveillance of the home of the secretary of then minister of defence Georg Leber, without Leber's knowledge. His secretary was suspected, incorrectly, of espionage for the East German Ministerium für Staatssicherheit (Ministry of State Security or Stasi). Leber was informed of the illegal surveillance at the beginning of 1978 but did not inform the Bundestag until the magazine Quick published an article on 26 January 1978. Georg Leber resigned from his position on 16 February 1978, against the wishes of chancellor Helmut Schmidt, taking sole responsibility for the surveillance scandal.

Another scandal was the Kießling Affair in 1983, when the MAD investigated Günter Kießling, a Bundeswehr four-star general working with NATO (Commander of NATO land forces and Deputy Supreme Allied Commander Europe). The general was deemed to be a security risk based on allegations of homosexuality originating from questionable sources, and was given early retirement by the then defence minister Manfred Wörner. The general was later rehabilitated. The affair had significant consequences for the service: the commander was removed, and a commission was set up under the former minister of the interior Hermann Höcherl (CSU) which investigated the way in which the MAD operated, and made recommendations for improvement which were implemented speedily.

As of September 1984, on the basis of the Höcherl report, the service was restructured and more civilian positions were created.

The MAD had 7 groups and 28 regional offices after the former East German army, the NVA (the National People's Army), was incorporated into the Bundeswehr in October 1990. This was reduced to 14 offices in 1994 when there was a reduction of the armed forces.

References

External links 
 Militärischer Abschirmdienst 
 Geheimdienste.org 

Bundeswehr
German intelligence agencies
Joint Support Service (Germany)
Military units and formations established in 1956
Military intelligence agencies
1956 establishments in Germany
Counterintelligence agencies